YPOPs! (previously known as YahooPOPs!) is open-source software that provides POP3 and SMTP access to Yahoo! Mail. It is available on the Microsoft Windows, Linux, Solaris and Mac platforms. The software was released in 2006 with the latest update being from 2009.

See also 
 FreePOPs

External links 
 YPOPs - Official Website
 Free POP3 and SMTP access to Yahoo! Mail using YPOPS! in Ubuntu

Free email software
Unix Internet software
Yahoo! Mail